When Arizona became a state in 1912, it was allocated a single seat in the United States House of Representatives, whose member was elected at-large, or statewide.

Arizona was represented by a single member of the House until the 1940 Census gave Arizona a second seat. However, both members continued to be elected statewide (on a general ticket) until 1949.

List of members representing the district

References 

 
 
 Congressional Biographical Directory of the United States 1774–present

At-large
At-large United States congressional districts
Former congressional districts of the United States
Constituencies established in 1912
1912 establishments in Arizona
Constituencies disestablished in 1949
1949 disestablishments in Arizona